Ralph Hauenstein (March 20, 1912 – January 10, 2016) was an American philanthropist, army officer and business leader, best known as a newspaper editor. His leadership has produced institutions such as the Hauenstein Center for Presidential Studies at Grand Valley State University, the Hauenstein Parkinsons and Neuroscience Centers at Saint Mary's Hospital and the Grace Hauenstein Library at Aquinas College.

Early life
Born in Fort Wayne, Indiana, in 1912, Hauenstein moved to Grand Rapids, Michigan at the age of twelve. In 1935, Hauenstein was commissioned in the U.S. Army as a second lieutenant and became commander of an all-African-American Civilian Conservation Corps camp in Michigan.

After two and one-half years on active duty, Hauenstein returned to civilian life and became city editor of the Grand Rapids Herald. In December 1940, one year before the attack on Pearl Harbor, he returned to active duty.  During the Second World War, he rose to the rank of colonel and served under General Dwight D. Eisenhower as chief of the Intelligence Branch in the Army's European theater of operations. In 1945, he was among the first Americans into liberated Paris, Germany, and Nazi concentration camps. The destruction convinced him to work for better international relations and peaceful solutions to conflict.

Post-war leadership and service
After the war, Hauenstein saw opportunities to build bridges between the United States and a Europe devastated by war. He went into international trade and partnered with European enterprises to provide goods and services to consumers in Europe, the Middle East, and elsewhere where democracies were struggling. He underwrote a modern bakery in Haiti, providing jobs for hundreds of workers and thousands of individual distributors at a difficult time in that nation's history. He also set up a school in Florida that taught people from developing countries how to run a fully automated bakery and provide good jobs in their local economy.

Hauenstein's leadership and service, however, went beyond the private sector. During the Dwight D. Eisenhower administration, Hauenstein served as a consultant on the President's Advisory Commission. He also served as an auditor at the Second Vatican Council in Rome and was part of the team that supervised the first free elections in Russia with the Jamestown Foundation in 1996.

Philanthropy
Hauenstein contributed to numerous charitable causes. His philanthropic efforts can be seen in higher education institutions in the West Michigan area: at Grand Valley State University, his contribution made possible the founding of the Hauenstein Center for Presidential Studies, whose mission is to inspire a new generation of leaders devoted to public service. The Grace Hauenstein Library is a prominent fixture on the Grand Rapids campus of Aquinas College.

Hauenstein's philanthropy extended into the field of medicine. In December 2003, Hauenstein contributed $2 million to Saint Mary's Health Care to jump start a $15 million campaign to create a comprehensive Neurosciences Center on the campus. From this initial donation—and  efforts to raise more money—the Mercy Health Hauenstein Neuroscience Center is a leader in the fight against this disease. Hauenstein was also one of three board members who established the Van Andel Institute for Medical Research in Grand Rapids and was one of its trustees.

Later life and death
In 2013, Hauenstein donated $1 million to the Hauenstein Center in celebration of its 10th anniversary. Hauenstein turned 100 in March 2012 and died in his sleep of natural causes at his home in Grand Rapids, Michigan on January 10, 2016, at the age of 103. His funeral Mass was said on January 15 by Bishop David J. Walkowiak of the Diocese of Grand Rapids at the Cathedral of Saint Andrew.

Leadership positions
Colonel-United States Army
Trustee-Van Andel Research Institute
Trustee-Gerald R. Ford Foundation
Trustee-Jamestown Foundation
Founder-Hauenstein Center for Presidential Studies
Founder-Hauenstein Parkinson's Center
President/chairman-Werner Lehara Corporation
President-Serra International

Awards 
Hauenstein was inducted into Omicron Delta Kappa - The National Leadership Honor Society as an honoris causa initiate at Grand Valley State University in 2012. In 2013 he was honored with the Laurel Crowned Circle Award, the society's highest honor.

Publications
Hauenstein, along with Donald Markle, authored a book about his role in the Allied efforts during World War II. Intelligence Was My Line: Inside Eisenhower's Other Command was published in 2005 by Hippocrene Books.

References

External links
The Hauenstein Center for Presidential Studies
Grand Valley State University
Saint Mary’s Hauenstein Parkinson’s Center
Van Andel Research Institute
The Jamestown Foundation
The Grace Hauenstein Library
Hippocrene Books
Education News

1912 births
2016 deaths
American centenarians
American memoirists
Men centenarians
United States Army personnel of World War II
American philanthropists
Civilian Conservation Corps people
Eisenhower administration personnel
Grand Valley State University people
People from Fort Wayne, Indiana
Businesspeople from Grand Rapids, Michigan
United States Army officers